Anaerostipes hadrus  is a Gram-positive bacterium from the genus of Anaerostipes which has been isolated from human faeces.

References

Further reading

External links
Type strain of Anaerostipes hadrus at BacDive -  the Bacterial Diversity Metadatabase	

Lachnospiraceae
Bacteria described in 1976